Warrant Officer Robert Swanwick is a retired Royal Australian Air Force non-commissioned officer. He served as Warrant Officer of the Air Force from 1 December 2015 until 6 November 2019.

References

Australian military personnel of the Iraq War
Royal Australian Air Force airmen